Mayson may refer to:

People
Ginger Mayson, American volleyball coach
Isabella Mayson a British author, better known as Isabella Beeton
Richard Mayson a New Zealand politician
Tom Fletcher Mayson a British recipient of the Victoria Cross
Tommy Mayson a British footballer

Other
Mayson (horse) a British Thoroughbred racehorse